Lynn Mathers Hilton (November 3, 1924 – August 12, 2020) was an American politician who served as a member of the Utah State Legislature. He was also known as an academic professor, businessman, Middle East explorer and author of many books related to the Church of Jesus Christ of Latter-day Saints.

Early life and education
Hilton was born in Thatcher, Arizona, to Eugene Hilton (1889–1982) and Ruth Naomi Savage (1891–1969, granddaughter of Levi Savage Jr.). He was raised in Berkeley and Oakland, California. He served as a pilot on a B-24 bomber in the United States Army Air Corps during World War II. After leaving the Army at the end of the war, Hilton served as a missionary (1945–47) for the Church of Jesus Christ of Latter-day Saints (LDS Church) in the church's New England Mission.

Hilton earned his B.S. and M.S. degrees at the University of Utah; and a Ph.D. in educational administration from the University of Chicago in 1952.

Career
After earning his Ph.D., Hilton became a professor of education at Brigham Young University. He later served as associate dean of continuing education and was the founder of the BYU Salt Lake Center.  Also among other things at BYU, Hilton helped to develop the first curriculum for genealogy courses.

Hilton served for one term as a member of the Utah House of Representatives, starting in 1972. In 1974 he ran unsuccessfully as a Republican candidate for the United States Congress.

In 1975 Hilton set up a business drilling wells for water in Egypt. He was also made the District President of The Church of Jesus Christ of Latter-day Saints over Egypt and Sudan at this time and worked for the four years he was in Egypt to try to get the LDS Church recognized by the Egyptian government.

By appointment of the LDS Church's Ensign magazine, Hilton was called to organize an expedition of discovery to find the trail of the Book of Mormon prophet Lehi and his family. The Book of Mormon says that Lehi's group left from Jerusalem in approximately 600 B.C., traveled through the wilderness to the place called Bountiful, and there built a ship in which they sailed to their promised land of America. This expedition was partly funded by the LDS Church. The results of Hilton's discoveries were first published in the Ensign in the September and October 1976 editions. Hilton wrote two books on this subject, In Search of the Lehi's Trail and Discovering Lehi. His wife, Hope, was co-author of each book. In 2008, Hilton published a DVD entitled Lehi's Trail in Arabia, a slide show and narration.

Hilton's first wife was Annalee Hope Averell; she normally went by Hope. They were married 51 years. They had five children. Hope died in 1999. Two years later he married Nancy Goldberg, a Jewish convert to the LDS Church. Goldberg had been a businesswoman in Dallas, Texas before joining the church in 1996. After this she sold her business and was called on a -year mission to work in the Family History Library. At the Family History Library, Nancy developed a database of Jewish-related resources in the library that earned her an award from the International Association of Jewish Genealogical Societies.

After the Hiltons married in 2001, they have served as missionaries for the LDS Church on five separate occasions. The first one was to Sydney, Australia, where they served as Regional Employment Directors. The second was a mission in LDS Church headquarters in Salt Lake City, Utah. The third was ten months in Irbid, Jordan, where Hilton was the branch president of the Irbid, Jordan branch; his wife did humanitarian work for the church. On this third mission, they also served eight months as the Directors of the Family History Center in Athens, Greece. The fourth and fifth missions were in New York and Boston respectively, where they performed family history work.

Hilton also wrote The Kolob Theorem: A Mormon's View of God's Starry Universe and The Pearl of Great Price Concordance.  Hilton also served as the editor of The Story of the Salt Lake Stake, the Salt Lake Stake's 125th anniversary history; he did this while serving on the Stake's high council. This work was published in 1972. Hilton also compiled an edition of Levi Savage Jr.'s journal. Hilton is a great-grandson of Savage.

Excommunication of Annalee Skarin 
Hope and Lynn Hilton played a central role in the excommunication of Annalee Skarin—Hope's mother in 1952.  They submitted a study they had made of her book, Ye Are Gods, to church Elder and president of the Deseret News, Mark E. Petersen.  Elder Petersen gave Annalee the choice of renouncing her writing as the work of Satan, or facing excommunication.

References

External links
 Lynn M. Hilton at the MLCA Database (includes photo)
Hilton Books bio
Biography of the Hiltons— focused on their genealogical work

1924 births
2020 deaths
20th-century Mormon missionaries
21st-century Mormon missionaries
American expatriates in Egypt
American expatriates in Jordan
American Mormon missionaries in Australia
American Mormon missionaries in Greece
American Mormon missionaries in the United States
Book of Mormon studies
Brigham Young University faculty
Republican Party members of the Utah House of Representatives
Mormon missionaries in Jordan
People from Thatcher, Arizona
University of Chicago alumni
University of Utah alumni
Writers from Arizona
United States Army Air Forces bomber pilots of World War II